Big Brother 17 is the seventeenth season of various versions of television show Big Brother and may refer to:

 Big Brother 17 (U.S.), the 2015 edition of the U.S. version
 Big Brother 17 (UK), the 2016 edition of the UK version
 Gran Hermano 17, the 2016 edition of the Spanish version
 Big Brother Brasil 17, the 2017 edition of the Brazilian version